Cupriavidus nantongensis  is a Gram-negative, chlorpyrifos-degrading and aerobic bacterium from the genus of Cupriavidus which has been isolated from sludge from Nantong in China.

References

External links
Type strain of Cupriavidus nantongensis at BacDive -  the Bacterial Diversity Metadatabase

 

Burkholderiaceae
Bacteria described in 2016